Peter Boumphrey (10 April 1919 – 10 November 2004) was a British alpine skier. He competed in the men's downhill at the 1948 Winter Olympics. Boumphrey was an officer in the British Army. Boumphrey went on to build the Isola 2000 ski resort in the Southern French Alps in the early 1970s.

References

1919 births
2004 deaths
Military personnel from Essex
British Army officers
British male alpine skiers
Olympic alpine skiers of Great Britain
Alpine skiers at the 1948 Winter Olympics
People from Rochford